The Western Connecticut Highlands AVA is an American Viticultural Area that includes all of Litchfield and parts of Fairfield, New Haven, and Hartford counties in Connecticut.  The Connecticut Highlands are far enough away from Long Island Sound that there is little of the moderating effect on climate that large bodies of water produce.  The region is relatively cool, with a short growing season between mid-May and mid-September.  The soil in the area is glacial schist and gneiss.  Local vintners have had the most success with cool climate Vitis vinifera and French hybrid grape varieties. The region is located in hardiness zones 5b and 6a.

References

American Viticultural Areas
Connecticut wine
Geography of Fairfield County, Connecticut
Geography of Hartford County, Connecticut
Geography of Litchfield County, Connecticut
Geography of New Haven County, Connecticut
1988 establishments in Connecticut